is a former Japanese football player.

Playing career
Hashimoto was born on January 13, 1969. In 1984, when he was 15 years old, he moved to Brazil and joined XV Novembro-Jaú. In the early 1990s, he played for Central and Corinthians Paulista. In July 1995, he returned to Japan and he joined the newly promoted J1 League club Kashiwa Reysol and played in one season. In 1997, he joined the Japan Football League club Fukushima FC. However, the club was disbanded at the end of the 1997 season due to financial strain. From 1999, he played for the Brazilian clubs Juazeiro, Paraná, Santa Cruz, and Luziânia. He retired at the end of the 2003 season.

References

External links
BBA PROMOTION

1969 births
Living people
Japanese footballers
Japanese expatriate footballers
Expatriate footballers in Brazil
Sport Club Corinthians Paulista players
J1 League players
Japan Football League (1992–1998) players
Kashiwa Reysol players
Fukushima FC players
Association football midfielders